Riyandi Ramadhana (born April 2, 1991 in Jakarta) is an Indonesian footballer that currently plays for Persegres Gresik United in the Indonesia Soccer Championship. And now Riyandi is the owner of Bros In The Box burger

References

External links

1991 births
Association football midfielders
Living people
Sportspeople from Jakarta
Indonesian footballers
Indonesian expatriate footballers
Liga 1 (Indonesia) players
Pelita Bandung Raya players
Association football defenders